Public holidays in Botswana are largely controlled by government sector employers who are given paid time off. The government holiday schedule mainly benefits employees of government and government regulated businesses. At the discretion of the employer, other non-federal holidays such as Christmas Eve are common additions to the list of paid holidays.

Major Christian holidays such as Christmas and Good Friday are officially observed, leave is permitted for other religious holidays as well. For example, some school children and employees take days off for Muslim holidays, Hindu holidays, or Eastern Orthodox observances according to the Julian calendar. While not normally taken off work, Valentine's Day, Halloween, Mother's Day, and Father's Day are traditionally observed by the Batswana.

Public holidays
A public holiday (also known as "stats" or "general" or "statutory" holiday) in Botswana is legislated through the parliament of Botswana. Most workers, public and private, are entitled to take the day off with regular pay. However, some employers may require employees to work on such a holiday, but the employee must either receive a day off in lieu of the holiday or must be paid at a premium rate – usually 1½ (known as "time and a half") or twice (known as "double time") the regular pay for their time worked that day, in addition to the holiday pay.

Nationwide public holidays in Botswana

Holidays with religious and cultural significance 
The religious and cultural holidays in Botswana are characterized by a diversity of religious beliefs and practices.

Christian holidays 
Some private businesses and certain other institutions are closed on Good Friday. The financial market and stock market is closed on Good Friday. Most retail stores remain open although some might close early. Public schools and most universities are closed on Good Friday, either as a holiday of its own, or part of spring break. The postal service operates, and banks regulated by the federal government do not close for Good Friday.

Many companies, including banks, malls, shopping centers and most private retail stores that normally open on Sundays are closed on Easter.

See also 

 Easter controversy

Notes

References

External links 
Calculating
 Dates for Easter 1583–9999
 A Perpetual Easter and Passover Calculator Julian and Gregorian Easter for any year plus other info

 
Botswana
Botswana culture